The Ecuador national badminton team represents Ecuador in international badminton team competitions. It is managed by Badminton Ecuador, the governing body for badminton in Ecuador. The Ecuador team competed in the 2008 Pan Am Badminton Championships mixed team event and finished in 9th place.

Ecuador also participates the South American Games. The nation won 2 bronze medals in doubles. The mixed team has yet to enter the quarterfinals of the mixed team event in the Games.

Participation in Pan American Badminton Championships
Mixed team

Participation in South American Games

Current squad 

Men
Emilio Zambrano Solano
Andy Baque Marcillo
Joseph Rodriguez
Henry Huebla
Diego Teran

Women
Maria Delia Zambrano
Maria Emilia Meija Coronel
Natalia Roman
Gladys Pluas
Melanie Mandich Tumbaco

References

Badminton
National badminton teams
Badminton in Ecuador